Funky house is a subgenre of house music that uses disco and funk samples, a funk-inspired bass line or a strong soul influence, combined with drum breaks that draw inspiration from 1970s and 1980s funk records. The use of disco strings are also common in the genre, although not always. Funky house uses specific techniques and a specific sound, characterized by bassline, swooshes, swirls and other synthesized sounds which give the music a bouncy tempo with around 128 BPM.

The genre is commercially popular, with record labels such as Defected Records, Ministry of Sound, Hed Kandi, and Fierce Angel all releasing compilation albums dedicated to the genre.

History

2000s–2010s 
It was particularly successful in the early and mid 2000s (decade).

2010s–present 
With the renewed interest in funk and disco in early 2010s, funky house genre is often being misused. The contemporary musicians are producing house music, based on funk and disco samples, but song's structure and characteristics are remains to be from the plain house. Such music is usually referred to as funk-house, which is a development of the parent genre, and is not related to the funky house.

References

20th-century music genres
House music genres